In United States legal education, hornbooks are one-volume legal treatises, written primarily for law students on subjects typically covered by law school courses.

Hornbooks summarize and explain the law in a specific area.  They are distinct from casebooks, which are collections of cases (or parts of cases) chosen to help illustrate and stimulate discussion about legal issues.

The term derives from the hornbook, an early children's educational tool, implying that the material is basic. A hornbook law is a basic, settled legal principle (see black letter law).

See also
 Black's Law Dictionary
 Bouvier's Law Dictionary
 Law dictionary
 Legal terminology textbook
 List of legal abbreviations
 Wex

References

External links
 A list of hornbooks and study aids, managed by the D'Angelo Law Library at the University of Chicago.

Law books
Legal education